Hatimrampur is a village in Bankura district. It comes under the jurisdiction of Hirbandh Community Development Block and Shankha Subhra Dey is the Block Development officer of the block. Hatimrampur is inhabited by a majority of Brahmin population and it is a quiet village with simple scenic beauty.

Education
Education of Hatirampur is Baharamuri High school centric. Located in middle of Hatirampur and Baharamuri village, Hirbandh [KHATRA-II] block and is  a Bengali-medium coeducational institution established in 1970. It has facilities for teaching from class V to class XII. The school has 10 computers and a library with 1,900 books

References

Villages in Bankura district